Castelvetro Piacentino, also known as Castelvetro, is a town and comune (municipality) in the Province of Piacenza in the Italian region Emilia-Romagna, located about  northwest of Bologna and about  east of Piacenza.

Geography
The municipality is located in the northwestern edge of its province, and is separated from Cremona, and Lombardy, by the river Po. the other bordering municipalities are Gerre de' Caprioli, Monticelli d'Ongina, Spinadesco, Stagno Lombardo and Villanova sull'Arda.

It counts the hamlets (frazioni) of Croce Santo Spirito, Mezzano Chitantolo, San Giuliano Piacentino and San Pietro in Corte (also known as San Pedretto).

Transport
Castelvetro has a railway station on the junction of the lines from Cremona to Fidenza and to Piacenza.

People
Mauro Cerioni (b. 1948), Olympic basketball player

References

External links
 
 Official website

Cities and towns in Emilia-Romagna